Big Bad Mama is a 1974 American action-crime-sexploitation comedy movie produced by Roger Corman, starring Angie Dickinson, William Shatner, and Tom Skerritt, with Susan Sennett and Robbie Lee. This movie is about a mother, Wilma (played by Dickinson), and her two daughters, Polly (Robbie Lee) and Billie Jean (Susan Sennett), who go on a crime spree. After the mother unexpectedly falls in love with a bank robber it all ends, with tragic consequences. Big Bad Mama became a cult hit and was followed by a sequel, Big Bad Mama II, in 1987.

Plot 
In Texas in 1932, after stopping her youngest daughter's wedding, Wilma McClatchie (Dickinson) takes over her late lover's bootlegging business, but gets caught while doing the delivery route with her two daughters. After handing over all her money and her ring to the sheriff, they are let go and she begins her crime spree.

While Wilma is at a bank trying to cash a fake check, the bank is held up by Fred Diller (Skerritt) and his gang. In the melee, Wilma and her daughters, Polly (Robbie Lee) and Billie Jean (Susan Sennett), grab some money bags from behind the counter and escape, but not before Diller gets in their automobile and leaves with them. Afterwards, they decide to pair up, and Diller and Wilma also become lovers.

During a subsequent con, Wilma meets the refined yet dishonest gambler William J. Baxter (Shatner) and falls for him. He joins the group and becomes Wilma's lover, much to the chagrin of Diller. The gang proceeds with several more heists, each time getting more money. Eventually, they kidnap the daughter of a millionaire in hopes of getting rich off the ransom. When the ransom is paid, federal agents who had been tracking them arrive with the police.

Baxter is captured, but Wilma, Polly, and Billie Jean escape with the suitcase full of money, and Diller stays behind, providing cover with his Tommy gun, which he uses to kill the handcuffed Baxter, who had been working as an informant with the agents. As the three women drive off, the mortally wounded Wilma's bloodied left arm is seen hanging down on the left side of the car.

Cast 
 Angie Dickinson as Wilma McClatchie
 Tom Skerritt as Fred Diller
 William Shatner as William J. Baxter
 Robbie Lee as Polly McClatchie
 Susan Sennett as Billie Jean McClatchie
 Noble Willingham as Uncle Barney
 Sally Kirkland as Barney's woman
 Dick Miller as Bonney
 Joan Prather as Jane Kingston
 Royal Dano as Rev. Johnson

Production

The movie is a loose follow-up to 1970's Bloody Mama, which starred Shelley Winters in the title role. That film was produced and directed by Roger Corman, who produced Big Bad Mama. Big Bad Mama is not a sequel (as Mama died in the original) or a remake. However, the core themes of a criminally active mother who shoots a tommy gun, has a strong sexual appetite, and is questioningly close to her grown children - two young ladies in this movie, four adult men in the previous one - are repeated.

The movie features a number of nude scenes by the three principal actresses, several of which are with the two principal actors. According to director Steve Carver, Angie Dickinson allowed the crew to remain on set during the filming of her sex scene with Tom Skerritt, but William Shatner asked for all nonessential crew to be removed during his sex scene with Dickinson.

Much of the bluegrass music for this movie was written by David Grisman. It was played by the Great American Music Band, and recorded and mixed by Bill Wolf.

Home media
On December 7, 2010, Shout! Factory released the title on DVD, packaged as a double feature with Big Bad Mama II as part of the Roger Corman's Cult Classics collection.

On March 30, 2016, Shout! Factory released Big Bad Mama on Blu-ray as a solo release. This Blu-ray is a BD/MOD (Blu-ray disc, manufactured on demand) release. It was announced on the Home Theater Forum, UHD Blu-ray/Blu-ray Forum.

See also
Bloody Mama
Crazy Mama

References

External links
 
 
 
 

1974 films
1970s crime action films
1970s action adventure films
1970s action comedy films
1970s crime comedy films
1974 comedy films
New World Pictures films
Films set in 1932
Films set in Texas
American crime action films
Films directed by Steve Carver
American action adventure films
American sexploitation films
American action comedy films
American crime comedy films
Girls with guns films
Films produced by Roger Corman
1970s English-language films
1970s American films